Dipaenae romani is a moth of the subfamily Arctiinae. It was described from San Gabriel.

References

Lithosiini